Pseudosystenocentrus foveolatus is a species of harvestmen in a monotypic genus in the family Sclerosomatidae.

Though the genus lacks distinct femoral nodules on all legs and technically belongs in the subfamily Leiobuninae. Due to its strong resemblance to Gagrellinae it has been provisionally assigned to that genus.

References

Harvestmen
Harvestman genera
Monotypic arachnid genera